Portlight may refer to:

 Another name for a lighthouse
 The heavy glass cover for a porthole
Portlight Strategies, an American charity helping hurricane victims

See also
Lighthouse (disambiguation)